Mount Oleg is a prominent  mountain summit located in the Cayoosh Range of the Lillooet Ranges, in southwestern British Columbia, Canada. Precipitation runoff from the peak drains into tributaries of the Fraser River.


Climate

Based on the Köppen climate classification, Mount Oleg is located in a subarctic climate zone of western North America. Most weather fronts originate in the Pacific Ocean, and travel east toward the Coast Mountains where they are forced upward by the range (Orographic lift), causing them to drop their moisture in the form of rain or snowfall. As a result, the Coast Mountains experience high precipitation, especially during the winter months in the form of snowfall. This climate supports the Place Glacier on the north slopes of Mount Oleg. Temperatures can drop below −20 °C with wind chill factors below −30 °C. The months July through September offer the most favorable weather for climbing Mount Oleg.

See also

 Geography of British Columbia
 Geology of British Columbia

References

Oleg
Oleg